Hala Elkoussy (born 1974) is an Egyptian artist and film director.

Elkoussy was born in Cairo in 1974. 

She received the Abraaj Capital Art Prize in Dubai in 2010. Her first film, Cactus Flower, was released in 2017. 

Her work is held in the collection of the Tate Museum, London, and Art Jameel, Saudi Arabia.

References

Living people
1974 births
20th-century Egyptian women artists
21st-century Egyptian women artists
Egyptian women film directors